Iron Hill may refer to: 

 Iron Hill, Quebec, Canada
 Iron Hill (Delaware), a hill near Newark, Delaware, U.S.
 Iron Hill, Pennsylvania, U.S.
 Iron Hill Bridge, Bucks County, Pennsylvania, U.S.

Other uses
 Iron Hills, in J. R. R. Tolkien's Middle-earth
 Iron Hills Conference, an athletic conference in New Jersey

See also
 Iron Mountain (disambiguation)